The Queen's Award for Enterprise: International Trade (Export) (2001) was awarded on 20 April.

Recipients
The following organisations were awarded this year.
AVX Limited MLC Division of County Londonderry, for Northern Ireland Multi-layer ceramic capacitors.
Abercrombie & Kent Europe Ltd of Burford, Oxfordshire for De-luxe travel services.
Adder Technology Ltd of Bar Hill, Cambridge for Computer peripheral equipment.
Aircom International of Redhill, Surrey for ENTERPRISE integrated software solution, consultancy and product support.
Aircontrol Technologies Ltd of Staines, Middlesex for Environmental life support systems.
AorTech Europe Limited of Bellshill, Lanarkshire, Scotland for Replacement heart valves.
Asset Security Managers Limited of London E1 for Specialist broking/advice on kidnap and ransom, product extortion and wrongful detention insurance.
The Association of Chartered Certified Accountants of London WC2 for Professional examinations and membership.
Julius Baer Investments Ltd of London EC3 for Investment advice.
Bibby Line Limited of Liverpool for Offshore and marine vessel operations.
Nigel Burgess Ltd of London SW1 for Luxury yacht brokerage, charter and management.
Celador of London WC2 for Television programmes.
Chemence Ltd of Corby, Northamptonshire for Engineering adhesives and sealants for industrial, consumer and medical markets.
C. & J. Clark Limited of Street, Somerset for Footwear.
Colefax & Fowler Limited of London W1 for Soft furnishings.
Cooke Optics Limited of Thurmaston, Leicester for A range of prime 35mm lenses.
Coombe Castle International Limited of Corsham, Wiltshire for Cheese and dairy products.
G. Costa & Co Ltd of Aylesford, Kent for Pan-oriental foods, including Chinese, Thai and Japanese ingredients, authentic sauces, dips, noodles and rice.
Delaware International Advisers Limited of London EC2 for Investment management.
Digital Vision Limited of London SE1 for Production and distribution of royalty free digital photography and film footage.
Domino Printing Sciences plc of Bar Hill, Cambridge for Ink jet and laser coding and marking equipment.
Fibercore Limited of Southampton, Hampshire for Optical fibres.
Gaffney, Cline & Associates of Alton, Hampshire for Consultancy services to the energy industry.
Glassbond (N.W.) Ltd of St Helens, Merseyside for Specialist cements and moulding powders.
Glotel Plc of London W1 for Telecommunications and networking consultancy.
Group 4 Technology Limited of Tewkesbury, Gloucestershire for Access control equipment.
Henrion, Ludlow & Schmidt Ltd of London SW1 for Corporate identity consultancy services.
ISG Thermal Systems Limited of Basildon, Essex for Thermal imaging cameras.
The Independent Fragrance Company of Northampton for Specialised fragrances.
Ivory & Ledoux Limited of London SW1 for Fruit juice concentrates and purees, frozen and canned fruits, vegetables and fish.
J & H Sales (International) Ltd of London E11 for Waste paper (secondary fibres) for recycling.
Junior Hagen Ltd of London NW10 for Exclusive fashion trimmings and accessories.
KW International t/a KWI of London SW6 for Computer software offering a completely integrated trading, risk management and settlement platform for energy markets.
Labtech Limited of Presteigne, Powys, Wales for Microwave printed circuits.
Land Rover of Solihull, West Midlands for Four wheel drive vehicles.
Less Common Metals Limited of Birkenhead, Merseyside for Reactive metal alloys.
Eli Lilly and Company Limited of Basingstoke, Hampshire for Pharmaceuticals and animal health products.
London Business School of London NW1 for Business education and post graduate business degree programmes.
M.O.S. (Miko Oilfield Supplies Ltd) of Shipley, West Yorkshire for Oilfield cranes and lifting appliances.
Malmic Lace Ltd of Ruddington, Nottingham for Lace, trimmings, elastic and rigid braids.
Martin-Baker Aircraft Company Limited of Uxbridge, Middlesex for Aircraft ejection seats.
Mechatherm International Limited of Kingswinford, West Midlands for Industrial furnaces and ovens.
Media Audits Ltd of London W1 for Media consultancy and evaluation services.
Milton Keynes Pressings Ltd of Bletchley, Milton Keynes for Metal pressings and welded assemblies.
JPMorgan Investor Services EMEA of London EC2 for Investor services.
NGF Europe Limited of St Helens, Merseyside for Rubber impregnated glass fibre cords.
Nutrition Trading (International) Ltd of Studley, Warwickshire for Speciality animal feeds.
Oceanair Marine Ltd of Chichester, West Sussex for Blinds and flyscreens for windows and hatches for boats and vehicles.
Oxford Instruments Plasma Technology Ltd of Yatton, Bristol for Plasma processing and ion beam etching and deposition equipment.
Oyster Marine of Ipswich, Suffolk for Deck saloon cruising yachts.
PAV Data Systems Ltd of Windermere, Cumbria for Wireless optical data transmission systems using infra-red lasers.
Paradise Datacom Limited of Tiptree, Essex for Satellite communications equipment.
Phase 1 Clinical Trials Unit Limited of Derriford, Plymouth for Clinical research on compounds for the pharmaceutical industry.
Pinacl Cables of Rhyl, Denbighshire, Wales for Fibre optic cables.
Quasar Microwave Technology Ltd of Newton Abbot, Devon for Microwave frequency waveguide components.
Randox Laboratories Ltd of Crumlin, County Antrim, for Northern Ireland Diagnostic kits for medical, veterinary and environmental monitoring.
Renishaw plc of Wotton-under-Edge, for Gloucestershire Metrology products enabling measurement to international standards.
Rochford Thompson Equipment Ltd of Newbury, Berkshire for Passport reading equipment.
Scottish Biomedical of Glasgow, Scotland for Biomedical consultancy services.
Shadbolt & Co Solicitors of Reigate, Surrey for Commercial legal services.
Shipley Europe Limited of Coventry for Speciality chemicals.
David S Smith Worldwide Dispensers of London SW19 for Precision engineered plastic taps, dispensers and valves.
Software 2000 Limited of Oxford for Driver software technologies for printers and copiers.
Special Commissions Department, Spink & Son Ltd of London WC1 for Decorations, medals and presentation gifts.
Stoneridge-Pollak Limited of Cheltenham, Gloucestershire for Electro-mechanical switches for the automotive industry.
Targus Europe Ltd of Hounslow, Middlesex for Accessories for mobile computers.
Thermomax Limited of Bangor, County Down, for Northern Ireland Vacuum tube solar collectors for water heating and also refrigeration controllers.
M & A Thomson Litho Ltd of East Kilbride, Glasgow, for Scotland Printing material and software.
Thorne International Boiler Services Limited of Bilston, Wolverhampton for Refurbishment and repair of industrial boilers.
The University of Nottingham of Nottingham for Higher educational and research services.
Vicon Motion Systems Limited of Oxford for Systems capturing the 3-dimensional motion of objects, particularly the human body.
Vision in Business Ltd of London WC2 for Business information services.
Wagtech International Ltd of Thatcham, Berkshire for Laboratory, water and environmental testing equipment.
John Wood Group PLC of Aberdeen, Scotland for New generation contracting, solutions and services to the global energy industries.
Wykes, A Division of Peel Street & Co Ltd of Leicester for Covered elastic yarns.
Zenith Print & Packaging Ltd of Treforest, Pontypridd, Wales for Printed giftset packaging.

References

Queen's Award for Enterprise: International Trade (Export)
2001 in the United Kingdom